Dr. B. Stauffer House is a historic home located at South Londonderry Township, Lebanon County, Pennsylvania. It was built in 1848, and is a -story, 3-bay wide by 4-bay brick residence in a vernacular Georgian style.  It has a hipped roof with a flat roofed dormer over the central bay.  The house has a connected brick smokehouse and features a two-story verandah. The house once included an apothecary shop.

It was added to the National Register of Historic Places in 1979.

References

Houses on the National Register of Historic Places in Pennsylvania
Georgian architecture in Pennsylvania
Houses completed in 1848
Houses in Lebanon County, Pennsylvania
National Register of Historic Places in Lebanon County, Pennsylvania